Sandra Elizabeth Black,  is a Canadian physician and neurologist known for her work in "contributing to improved diagnosis and treatment of vascular dementia, Alzheimer's disease and stroke". She is currently a Senior scientist at Toronto's Sunnybrook Health Sciences Centre. She holds the Brill Chair in Neurology in the Department of Medicine at the University of Toronto.

Early life and education 
The daughter of Harriet (Peterson) Black, CM, co-founder of the Algoma Fall Festival, and Thomas Black, an obstetrician and gynecologist, Black was raised in Sault Ste. Marie, Ontario. Black received a Bachelor of Science degree in biological and medical sciences in 1969 from the University of Toronto. She received a Master of Arts degree in history and philosophy of science from Oxford University in 1970. She received her Medical Doctorate (MD) in 1978 from University of Toronto and a Fellowship in cognitive neurology in 1984 from the University of Western Ontario.

Black attended the University of Toronto where she received her Bachelor of Science (Hons) in 1969 and her Doctor of Medicine (MD) in 1978.  Black also studied at Oxford University where she received a diploma in the History and Philosophy of Science and at Western University where she was a Fellow in Cognitive Neurology.

Awards and honours
 Fellow of the Royal Society of Canada, 2012
 Active member of the Order of Ontario
 Officer of the Order of Canada.
 Outstanding researcher of the year award, department of medicine, University of Toronto, 2013
 Elected to Royal Society of Canada, 2012
 Irma M. Parhad Award for Excellence, Consortium of Canadian Centres for Clinical Cognitive Research, 2011

References

External links
 

Living people
Place of birth missing (living people)
Year of birth missing (living people)
Alumni of the University of Oxford
Alzheimer's disease researchers
Canadian neurologists
Canadian women physicians
20th-century Canadian physicians
21st-century Canadian physicians
Fellows of the Royal Society of Canada
Members of the Order of Ontario
Officers of the Order of Canada
People from Sault Ste. Marie, Ontario
University of Western Ontario alumni
University of Toronto alumni
Academic staff of the University of Toronto
Scientists from Toronto
20th-century Canadian scientists
21st-century Canadian scientists
20th-century women physicians
20th-century Canadian women scientists
21st-century Canadian women scientists
21st-century women physicians